Jørgen Fryd Petersen (19 July 1925 – 28 February 1988) was a Danish weightlifter. He competed in the men's lightweight event at the 1948 Summer Olympics.

References

1925 births
1988 deaths
Danish male weightlifters
Olympic weightlifters of Denmark
Weightlifters at the 1948 Summer Olympics
Sportspeople from Copenhagen